His Own People is a 1917 American silent drama film directed by William P. S. Earle and starring Harry T. Morey, Gladys Leslie, Arthur Donaldson, William R. Dunn, and Betty Blythe. The film was released by Vitagraph Company of America on December 31, 1917.

Plot

Cast
Harry T. Morey as Hugh O'Donnell (as Harry Morey)
Gladys Leslie as Molly Conway
Arthur Donaldson as Shamus Reilly
William R. Dunn as Percival Cheltenham (as William Dunn)
Betty Blythe as Lady Mary Thorne
Stanley Dunn as Patrick McCormack

Preservation
The film is now considered lost.

References

External links

Silent American drama films
1917 films
American silent feature films
American black-and-white films
Vitagraph Studios films
1917 lost films
Lost American films
1917 drama films
Lost drama films
1910s American films